Christoph Springer (born 30 October 1985 in Oberndorf am Neckar) is a German former cyclist.

Major results
2009
 1st Overall Tour d'Egypte
2011
 2nd Overall Tour d'Indonesia
 9th Overall Tour of Szeklerland
 10th Overall Sibiu Cycling Tour
2012
 7th Overall La Tropicale Amissa Bongo
 7th Overall Tour of Bulgaria

References

1985 births
Living people
German male cyclists
People from Oberndorf am Neckar
Sportspeople from Freiburg (region)
Cyclists from Baden-Württemberg
21st-century German people